Haining railway station is a railway station on the Shanghai–Kunming railway located in Haining, Jiaxing, Zhejiang in  China.

See also 
 Haining West railway station

References 

Railway stations in Zhejiang